Ila Majumder (9 September 1941 — 3 May 2011) was a Bangladeshi classical vocalist. Bangladesh Shilpakala Academy awarded her for the special contribution in the field of culture. She was the spouse of the classical musician of Barin Mazumder.

Early life and career
Majumder had been taught on music by her future husband Barin Mazumder since 1954. She completed her master's in philosophy in 1961. She had served as a teacher in the Willes Little Flower School during 1981–2003. She also served as a part-time teacher in the National Music College for 15 years.

Majumder was the mother of musician Bappa Mazumder, music composer Partha Sharothi Mojumdar and mime artist Partha Pratim Majumder.

Works
 Smritite Srutite Barin Majumder 
 Dinguli Mor
 Sangiter Tattakatha

References

1941 births
2011 deaths
People from Pabna District
20th-century Bangladeshi women singers
20th-century Bangladeshi singers
Bangladeshi Hindus